The Road to Reno is a 1931 American pre-Code drama film directed by Richard Wallace and starring Lilyan Tashman, Charles "Buddy" Rogers, Peggy Shannon, and William "Stage" Boyd.

Plot
Twice divorced Jackie Millet tries one more time with number three. Unfortunately, her wedding is suddenly halted when the woman's son kills the groom during the ceremony, and then shoots himself.

Cast
 Lilyan Tashman as Mrs. Joyce Millet
 Charles "Buddy" Rogers as Tom Wood
 Peggy Shannon as Lee Millet
 William "Stage" Boyd as Jerry Kenton
 Irving Pichel as Robert Millet
 Wynne Gibson as Mrs. It-Ritch
 Richard "Skeets" Gallagher as Hoppie
 Tom Douglas as Jeff Millet
 Judith Wood as Elsie Kenton
 Leni Stengel as Mrs. Stafford Howes
 Emile Chautard as Andre

See also
The House That Shadows Built (1931 promotional film by Paramount)

External links

1931 films
American black-and-white films
1931 drama films
Films directed by Richard Wallace
Films scored by John Leipold
Paramount Pictures films
American drama films
1930s English-language films
1930s American films